Huntingtin Interacting Protein (HIP) may refer to:

 HIP1 (Huntingtin-interacting protein 1)
 HIP1R (Huntingtin-interacting protein 1 related protein)
 HIP2 (Huntingtin-interacting protein 2) a.k.a. Ubiquitin-conjugating enzyme E2 K

See also
 Huntingtin

Human proteins